Ben Barber (born 25 August 1984) is an Australian actor best known for playing Rhys Lawson in the Australian soap opera Neighbours.

Early life
Barber grew up in Warrnambool, Victoria. He took part in amateur dramatics while he attended Brauer College. After graduating, he chose not to pursue acting and joined the army reserve. Upon leaving the army, Barber took a part-time acting course at the Victorian College of the Arts, before he was accepted into the National Institute of Dramatic Arts.

Career
Barber's first major television appearance was in the Australian soap opera Home and Away. He was later cast in another soap opera, Neighbours as a regular character, Rhys Lawson. In November 2012, it was announced that Barber would be leaving Neighbours in 2013. Barber made a guest appearance during the third season of Janet King in 2017.

Filmography

Theatre work

References

External links

Ben Barber at Mark Morrissey & Associates

1984 births
Living people
Australian male stage actors
Australian male soap opera actors